This is a list of diseases of the African daisy (Gerbera jamesonii) plant

Bacterial diseases

Fungal diseases

Nematodes, parasitic

Virus and viroid diseases

Phytoplasmal diseases

References
Common Names of Diseases, The American Phytopathological Society

African daisy